Sunshine pop (originally known as soft pop) is a subgenre of pop music that originated in Southern California in the mid-1960s. Rooted in easy listening and advertising jingles, sunshine pop acts combined nostalgic or anxious moods with "an appreciation for the beauty of the world". It largely consisted of lesser-known artists who imitated more popular groups such as the Mamas & the Papas and the 5th Dimension. While the Beach Boys are noted as prominent influences, the band's own music was rarely representative of the genre.

Sunshine pop enjoyed mainstream success in the latter half of the decade, with many of its top 40 hits peaking in the spring and summer of 1967, especially just before the Summer of Love. Popular acts include the Turtles and the Association. Other groups, like the Millennium, Sagittarius, and the Yellow Balloon were less successful but gained a cult following years later with albums like Begin (Millennium, 1968) and Present Tense (Sagittarius, 1968) being sought after on the collectors’ market.

Origins and characteristics

Sunshine pop originated in California in the mid to late-1960s, beginning as an outgrowth of the California Sound and folk rock movements. Rooted in  easy-listening, advertising jingles, and the growing drug culture, the music was characterized by lush vocals and light arrangements similar to samba music. Most of the acts were lesser-known bands named after fruits, colors, or cosmic concepts that imitated popular groups like the Beach Boys, the Mamas & the Papas, and the 5th Dimension. In some ways, the genre is similar to baroque pop through being elaborate and melancholic, but it crossed into folk-pop and Brill Building styles. It may be seen as a form of escapism from the turmoil of the times. The A.V. Clubs Noel Murray writes: "sunshine pop acts expressed an appreciation for the beauty of the world mixed with a sense of anxiety that the good ol' days were gone for good."

Some of the artists who influenced the style include Curt Boettcher, the Mamas & the Papas' John Phillips, and the Beach Boys' Brian Wilson. Concerning the Beach Boys' involvement with sunshine pop, the orchestral style of Pet Sounds (1966) was imitated by many Los Angeles record producers, but The A.V. Club notes: "Though [the Beach Boys] ... were hugely influential on the sunshine pop acts that followed, [their] music was rarely in step with the genre." The Suburbans Joel Goldenburg believes the closest the group ever came to the genre was the lightly produced album Friends (1968): "the vocals of sunshine pop songs are a little more anonymous and not as lushly featured as that of The Beach Boys. And I don't see the [Phil] Spector connection. The light touch applied to the songs reminds me more of soft samba music." Murray says that "John Phillips, on the other hand, practically created the blueprint for sunshine pop, with little of Wilson's uncommercial weirdness." Brian Wilson commented that "you can turn the Beach Boys upside down ... just the track or whatever, and I think they [the Mamas & the Papas] have as much vocal as we do track ... whereas, I think, we emphasize a little more track than vocal."

Sunshine pop and the California Sound's influence expanded to other countries. In Spain, it initially was pioneered by groups like Pic-Nic, Granada Los Ángeles and Los Iberos in 1968. Between 1969 and the 1970s there was a boom of "soft pop" acts in the country, among them Los Yetis, Solera, Módulos, Nuevos Horizontes and Vainica Doble.

Rediscovery
After its peak in the 1960s, the genre lingered in near-obscurity, although it enjoyed some interest among collectors of rare vinyl singles and LPs. Select albums would occasionally fetch hefty prices at online auctions or in record stores. A name was eventually given to the music, "sunshine pop", although it was rarely deployed outside of record collecting circles. In the early 1990s, a renewed interest began in Japan, where record companies started publishing compilations of long-forgotten, obscure 1960s music. This revival subsequently spread to Europe and the United States.

Compilations and box-sets by groups such as Spanky and Our Gang, The Association, The Arbors and The Love Generation have been released on CD. Among the record labels which issue sunshine pop re-releases are Revola Records in Britain and the US label Sundazed.

See also

 List of sunshine pop artists
 Come to the Sunshine: Soft Pop Nuggets from the WEA Vaults
 Bubblegum pop
 Microgenres
 Soft rock

References

Bibliography
 
 

 

 
California Sound
Music of California
Pop music genres
1960s in California
1960s in American music
American styles of music
History of Southern California
20th-century music genres
American rock music genres
Youth culture in the United States